Panimerus is a genus of flies belonging to the family Psychodidae.

Species
Panimerus albifacies (Tonnoir, 1919)
Panimerus arnaudi Wagner, 1984
Panimerus basalis (Banks, 1907)
Panimerus cio (Quate, 1955)
Panimerus denticulatus Krek, 1972
Panimerus dysmica (Quate, 1955)
Panimerus elongatus Wagner, 1981
Panimerus freidbergi Wagner, 1984
Panimerus goetghebueri (Tonnoir, 1919)
Panimerus goodi Vaillant & Withers, 1992
Panimerus halophilus Kvifte & Salmela, 2020
Panimerus hermelinus Vaillant & Moubayed, 1987
Panimerus idukii Ipe, Ipe & Kishore, 1986
Panimerus idukkii Ipe, Ipe & Kishore, 1986
Panimerus integellus (Jung, 1956)
Panimerus kalathensis Ipe & Singh, 1994
Panimerus kreki Vaillant, 1972
Panimerus lucens Vaillant, 1973
Panimerus maynei (Tonnoir, 1920)
Panimerus nadorensis Eaton, 1913
Panimerus notabilis (Eaton, 1893)
Panimerus przhiboroi Wagner, 2005
Panimerus ruehmi Elger, 1979
Panimerus sarai Salamanna, 1975
Panimerus scalus (Haseman, 1907)
Panimerus scotti Eaton, 1913
Panimerus serbicus Krek, 1985
Panimerus sierra (Quate, 1955)
Panimerus unae Krek, 1978
Panimerus verneysicus Vaillant, 1972

References

Nematocera genera
Psychodidae
Taxa named by Alfred Edwin Eaton